The Geldersche Stoomtramweg Maatschappij was a  gauge steam tram that operated over  between Arnhem, Doetinchem and Gendringen in the Netherlands, with a short section extending to Isselburg in Germany. It was built in 1881 and was closed around 1957. Several other tramways were amalgamated into the Geldersche Stoomtramweg Maatschappij. The Tramweg Maatschappij Zutphen-Emmerik was also taken over in 1934, and the Tramweg Maatschappij De Graafschap in 1939.

See also 
 Narrow-gauge railways in the Netherlands

References

External links 
 Photographs of a preserved GSM tram locomotive and coach

Steam trams in the Netherlands
750 mm gauge railways in the Netherlands
750 mm gauge railways in Germany
History of Gelderland
History of North Rhine-Westphalia